The 1986 NCAA Division I men's basketball championship game was the finals of the 1986 NCAA Division I men's basketball tournament and it determined the national champion for the 1985–86 NCAA Division I men's basketball season  The 1986 National Title Game was played on March 31, 1986 at Reunion Arena in Dallas, Texas. The 1986 National Title Game was played between the 1986 East Regional Champions, Duke and the 1986 West Regional Champions, Louisville.

Participating teams

Louisville

West
Louisville (2) 93, Drexel (15) 73
Louisville 82, Bradley (7) 68
Louisville 94, North Carolina (3) 79
Louisville 84, Auburn (8) 76
Final Four
Louisville 88, LSU (11) 77

Duke

East
Duke (1) 85, Mississippi Valley State (16) 78
Duke 89, Old Dominion (8) 61
Duke 74, DePaul (12) 67
Duke 71, Navy (7) 50
Final Four
Duke 71, Kansas (1) 67

Starting lineups

Game summary

References

External links
 
 Box score via Sports Reference

NCAA Division I Men's Basketball Championship Game
NCAA Division I Men's Basketball Championship Games
Duke Blue Devils men's basketball
Louisville Cardinals men's basketball
Basketball in the Dallas–Fort Worth metroplex
College sports in Texas
Sports competitions in Dallas
NCAA Division I Men's Basketball Championship Game
NCAA Division I Basketball Championship Game, 1986
NCAA Division I Basketball Championship Game